The action of 13 December 1964 was a minor naval action between the Australian minesweeper  and two Indonesian vessels on 13 December 1964 during the Indonesia–Malaysia confrontation. HMAS Teal was engaged by Indonesian vessels in the Singapore Strait. Return fire from the Australian ship killed three, whilst four other Indonesians were subsequently captured.

Action
HMAS Teal whilst conducting patrols of the Singapore Strait intercepted two Indonesian sampans 1 mile from Raffles Lighthouse. Upon interception of the unlit sampans, Teal was fired upon with automatic weapons from the sampans. The sampans turned towards Indonesian waters, however one sampan was overpowered by Teal following further small arms engagements that killed three of the seven Indonesian crew members. The remaining crew, including an officer of the Indonesian Marines, surrendered. On board the sampan, a quantity of explosives, weapons and military equipment was found.

Aftermath
Lieutenant Keith Murray was awarded the Distinguished Service Cross, for his coolness and judgement during the action. The Distinguished Service Cross was the only award for gallant or distinguished service made to the Royal Australian Navy during the Indonesia–Malaysia confrontation.

See also
Military history of Australia during the Indonesia–Malaysia Confrontation

Notes

References
 

Conflicts in 1964
1964 in Malaysia
Battles of the Indonesia–Malaysia confrontation
Battles of the Indonesia–Malaysia confrontation involving Australia
Naval battles involving Australia
Battles involving Indonesia
December 1964 events in Asia